Seven ships of the Royal Navy have borne the name HMS Kite, after the kite, a bird of prey:

 was a 6-gun cutter launched in 1764 and sold in 1771.
 was a 12-gun cutter purchased in 1778, rated as a sloop between 1779 and 1783, and sold in 1793.
 was a 16-gun brig-sloop launched in 1795 and sold in 1805.
 was a 16-gun brig-sloop launched in 1805 and sold in 1815.
 was a wooden paddle vessel, previously the GPO ship Aetna. She was launched in 1826, transferred to the navy in 1837 and sold in 1864.
 was an iron  screw gunboat launched in 1871 and sold in 1920, becoming a dredger.
 was a Modified  launched in 1942 and sunk by a German U-boat in 1944.

See also
, a hired armed transport wrecked in the Yangtze in 1840.

Royal Navy ship names